Tomas Radzinevičius (born 5 June 1981) is a Lithuanian former professional footballer who played as a striker.

Radzinevičius played for eleven different clubs throughout his career. He started professional career for a local side Sūduva and later moved to clubs in Czech Republic, Poland and Slovakia. He returned to Sūduva before 2013 season, where he took over captaincy. In 2015 season he became top scorer of the A Lyga, managing 28 goals being 34 years old. He moved to Maltese Premier League champions Valletta in the winter of 2017, but haven't received much playing time. Forward decided to end his career on 18 June 2017.

At international level, Radzinevičius represented the Lithuanian national team on 21 occasions, scoring 1 goal. He made his international debut in 2003 and played his last match in 2007. Despite receiving invitations until late 2016 he never had a chance to appear for his nation once again.

Career
While playing for Sūduva, he scored a hat-trick against Brann in the qualifying round of the UEFA Cup 2002–03, greatly contributing to his side's 3–2 victory. The same year he was voted the best player in A Lyga.

Radzinevičius has represented Lithuania at both under-21 and senior level, scoring one goal for his national team.

In July 2009 Radzinevičius was transferred to Polish Ekstraklasa side Odra Wodzisław.

International goals
Scores and results list Lithuania's goal tally first.

Honours
National Team
 Baltic Cup
 2005

References

External links
 
 

1981 births
Living people
Lithuanian footballers
Lithuania international footballers
Lithuanian expatriate footballers
Association football forwards
FK Sūduva Marijampolė players
FC Slovan Liberec players
SK Kladno players
SK Dynamo České Budějovice players
Odra Wodzisław Śląski players
FK Baník Sokolov players
FK Senica players
FK Fotbal Třinec players
MFK Karviná players
SFC Opava players
Valletta F.C. players
A Lyga players
Czech First League players
Ekstraklasa players
Slovak Super Liga players
Maltese Premier League players
Expatriate footballers in the Czech Republic
Lithuanian expatriate sportspeople in the Czech Republic
Expatriate footballers in Poland
Lithuanian expatriate sportspeople in Poland
Expatriate footballers in Slovakia
Lithuanian expatriate sportspeople in Slovakia
Expatriate footballers in Malta
Lithuanian expatriate sportspeople in Malta
I Lyga players